Hong Su-yeon (born 5 April 1976), better known by her stage name Chunja, is a South Korean singer known for her androgynous appearance. She debuted in 2004. She won the 2006 M-Net award for best single, as well as the 2004 award for best new artist.

Biography
Chunja originally debuted as a dj with the pseudonym "new lian(뉴리안)" but officially debuted as chunja  in 2004 with her 1st album "It's only a woman when you have pretty breasts(가슴이 예뻐야 여자다)". Her music video for her song "It's only a woman when you have pretty breasts" gained  interest after Nam Hee-suk directed the music video.

Awards
2004: Mnet Asian Music Awards - Best New Female Artist

References

Personal life
She grew up in a South Korean town named Sanbon.

1979 births
Living people
South Korean women pop singers
South Korean rhythm and blues singers
South Korean pop rock singers
MAMA Award winners
21st-century South Korean singers
21st-century South Korean women singers